The 1985 Family Circle Cup was a women's tennis tournament played on outdoor clay courts at the Sea Pines Plantation on Hilton Head Island, South Carolina in the United States and was part of the Category 4 tier of the 1985 WTA Tour. It was the 13th edition of the tournament and ran from April 8 through April 14, 1985. First-seeded Chris Evert-Lloyd won the singles title, her second consecutive and eighth in total at the event.

Finals

Singles
 Chris Evert-Lloyd defeated  Gabriela Sabatini 6–4, 6-0
 It was Evert-Lloyd's 3rd singles title of the year and the 135th of her career.

Doubles
 Rosalyn Fairbank /  Pam Shriver defeated  Svetlana Parkhomenko /  Larisa Savchenko 6–4, 6–1
 It was Fairbank's 1st doubles title of the year and the 10th of her career. It was Shriver's 3rd doubles title of the year and the 59th of her career.

References

External links
 Official website
 ITF tournament edition details

Family Circle Cup
Charleston Open
Family Circle Cup
Family Circle Cup
Family Circle Cup